Coca-Cola Topnotchers is an American old-time radio program starring sportscaster Grantland Rice and announced by Graham McNamee who, at the time, was regarded as "the [radio's] most recognized national personality in its first international decade."

The late-night program featured interviews with well-known sports celebrities and personalities of the era and sometimes included special instances during which McNamee spent several minutes reporting the latest in sports-related news. A 31-piece all-string orchestra provided music to supplement the verbal segments.

The program was broadcast live every Wednesday evening for its entire run from March 19, 1930, until May 25, 1932. It originated in the studios of WEAF in New York and was carried nationally over the NBC Red Network.

Some content from the program's broadcasts was released on Victor recordings CVE-59833 through CVE59839.

See also

Academy Award Theater
Author's Playhouse
The Campbell Playhouse
Cavalcade of America
CBS Radio Workshop
Ford Theatre
General Electric Theater
Lux Radio Theatre
The Mercury Theatre on the Air
The MGM Theater of the Air
The Screen Guild Theater
Screen Director's Playhouse

References

American sports radio programs
1930 radio programme debuts
1932 radio programme endings
NBC radio programs
1930s American radio programs
American variety radio series